David Govrin (born 23 August 1963) is an Israeli diplomat and the former director of Israel’s liaison office in Morocco.

Career 
Govrin has served as an Israeli diplomat since 1989. He served as the First Secretary at the Israeli Embassy in Egypt (1994–1997) and as a Political Counselor in the Permanent Mission of Israel to the UN. In addition, he has served in a variety of positions in the Israeli Ministry of Foreign Affairs, including that of Head of the Jordanian Department and Head of department in the Ministry's Planning Bureau. He speaks fluent Arabic, and served as Israel's ambassador to Egypt from 2016 to 2020.

In January 2021, the Israeli Ministry of Foreign Affairs nominated Govrin as Israel's permanent ambassador to Morocco after the two countries agreed to normalize ties in a US-brokered agreement in December 2020.

Sexual misconduct allegations 
In September 2022, the Israeli Ministry of Foreign Affairs sent a team to the Liaison Office in Morocco to begin an investigation following allegations of corruption (unreported gifts) and sexual misconduct involving David Govrin with local women. Govrin claimed they were “false allegations and slander.” and that they were fabricated by the chief security officer of the Israeli Liaison in Rabat after a personal feud between the two.

Govrin was recalled amid the investigations, and Alona Fisher-Kamm was appointed to replace him temporarily.

Education 
Govrin holds a PhD from the Department of Middle Eastern and Islamic Studies at the Hebrew University of Jerusalem and was a research fellow at the Harry S. Truman Research Institute for the Advancement of Peace until 2016.

Selected works 
 The Journey to The Arab Spring: The Ideological Roots of the Middle East Upheaval in Arab Liberal Thought

References 

1963 births
Living people
Ambassadors of Israel to Egypt
Hebrew University of Jerusalem alumni
Israeli diplomats
Israeli envoys to Morocco